Lasiosceles is a synonym of two or three genera of moths, all in the superfamily Noctuoidea:

Lasiosceles Hampson, 1909 is a synonym of 
Scelilasia Hampson, 1914 or
Gymnelia Walker, 1854
Lasiosceles Bethune-Baker, 1906 is a synonym of Data Walker, 1862